The 2004 Chicago White Sox season was the White Sox's 105th season, and their 104th season in Major League Baseball. They finished with a record of 83-79, good enough for 2nd place in the American League Central, 9 games behind the champion Minnesota Twins.

Offseason 
 11/3/03: Named Ozzie Guillén manager.
 11/26/03: Sandy Alomar Jr. was signed as a free agent with the Chicago White Sox.
 12/2/03: Acquired Shortstop Juan Uribe from the Colorado Rockies in exchange for Aaron Miles.
 1/7/04: Agreed to terms with relief pitcher Cliff Politte on a one-year contract with a club option for 2005.
 1/22/04: Signed relief pitcher Shingo Takatsu to a one-year contract, with a club option for 2005.

Regular season

Season standings

Record vs. opponents

Opening Day starters

Notable transactions 
 6/17/04: Billy Koch was traded by the Chicago White Sox to the Florida Marlins for Wilson Valdez and cash.
 6/27/04: Traded catcher Miguel Olivo, minor league outfielder Jeremy Reed and minor league Infielder Mike Morse to the Seattle Mariners for starting pitcher Freddy García and Catcher Ben Davis.
 7/31/04: Traded starting pitcher Esteban Loaiza to the New York Yankees for starting pitcher José Contreras.

Roster

Game log 

|- style="text-align:center;background-color:#ffbbbb"
| 1 || April 5 || @ Royals || 7–9 || Carrasco (1–0) || Marte (0–1) || || 2:46 || 41,575 || 0–1 || box
|- style="text-align:center;background-color:#bbffbb"
| 2 || April 7 || @ Royals || 4–3 || Loaiza (1–0) || May (0–1) || Koch (1) || 3:05 || 16,134 || 1–1 || box
|- style="text-align:center;background-color:#ffbbbb"
| 3 || April 8 || @ Yankees || 1–3 || Vázquez (1–0) || Schoeneweis (0–1) || Rivera (2) || 2:28 || 55,290 || 1–2 || box
|- style="text-align:center;background-color:#bbffbb"
| 4 || April 9 || @ Yankees || 9–3 || Garland (1–0) || Contreras (0–1) || || 2:58 || 45,965 || 2–2 || box
|- style="text-align:center;background-color:#bbffbb"
| 5 || April 10 || @ Yankees || 7–3 || Buehrle (1–0) || DePaula (0–1) || || 2:34 || 47,911 || 3–2 || box
|- style="text-align:center;background-color:#ffbbbb"
| 6 || April 11 || @ Yankees || 4–5 || Mussina (1–2) || Wright (0–1) || Rivera (3) || 2:42 || 37,484 || 3–3 || box
|- style="text-align:center;background-color:#bbffbb"
| 7 || April 13 || Royals || 12–5 || Loaiza (2–0) || May (0–2) || || 2:48 || 37,706 || 4–3 || box
|- style="text-align:center;background-color:#bbffbb"
| 8 || April 14 || Royals || 10–9 || Adkins (1–0) || Leskanic (0–1) || || 3:27 || 11,765 || 5–3 || box
|- style="text-align:center;background-color:#bbffbb"
| 9 || April 15 || Royals || 6 – 5 (10) || Marte (1–1) || Carrasco (1–1) || || 2:36 || 15,150 || 6–3 || box
|- style="text-align:center;background-color:#ffbbbb"
| 10 || April 16 || @ Devil Rays || 0–3 || Abbott (1–1) || Wright (0–2) || Báez (1) || 2:14 || 12,108 || 6–4 || box
|- style="text-align:center;background-color:#bbffbb"
| 11 || April 17 || @ Devil Rays || 4–1 || Schoeneweis (1–1) || Zambrano (3–1) || Marte (1) || 2:39 || 14,302 || 7–4 || box
|- style="text-align:center;background-color:#bbffbb"
| 12 || April 18 || @ Devil Rays || 5–0 || Loaiza (3–0) || González (0–3) || || 2:12 || 12,072 || 8–4 || box
|- style="text-align:center;background-color:#ffbbbb"
| 13 || April 20 || Yankees || 8–11 || Quantrill (2–0) || Buehrle (1–1) || Rivera (4) || 3:01 || 32,034 || 8–5 || box
|- style="text-align:center;background-color:#ffbbbb"
| 14 || April 21 || Yankees || 1–3 || Vázquez (2–1) || Garland (1–1) || Rivera (5) || 2:32 || 26,154 || 8–6 || box
|- style="text-align:center;background-color:#bbffbb"
| 15 || April 22 || Yankees || 4–3 || Schoeneweis (2–1) || Mussina (1–4) || Marte (2) || 2:27 || 34,030 || 9–6 || box
|- style="text-align:center;background-color:#bbffbb"
| 16 || April 23 || Devil Rays || 3 – 2 (10) || Koch (1–0) || Báez (1–1) || || 3:00 || 12,049 || 10–6 || box
|- style="text-align:center;background-color:#ffbbbb"
| 17 || April 24 || Devil Rays || 1–4 || Waechter (1–0) || Wright (0–3) || Báez (2) || 2:44 || 17,062 || 10–7 || box
|- style="text-align:center;background-color:#bbffbb"
| 18 || April 25 || Devil Rays || 6–5 || Adkins (2–0) || Miller (0–1) || || 2:43 || 17,497 || 11–7 || box
|- style="text-align:center;background-color:#ffbbbb"
| 19 || April 27 || Indians || 7 – 11 (10) || Betancourt (2–2) || Adkins (2–1) || || 3:53 || 14,572 || 11–8 || box
|- style="text-align:center;background-color:#bbffbb"
| 20 || April 28 || Indians || 9–8 || Jackson (1–0) || Betancourt (2–3) || || 2:55 || 12,189 || 12–8 || box
|- style="text-align:center;background-color:#bbffbb"
| 21 || April 29 || Blue Jays || 6–4 || Loaiza (3–0) || Nakamura (0–1) || Koch (2) || 2:47 || 11,210 || 13–8 || box
|- style="text-align:center;background-color:#bbbbbb"
| – || April 30 || Blue Jays ||colspan=8| Postponed (rain), rescheduled for May 1

|- style="text-align:center;background-color:#bbffbb"
| 22 || May 1 || Blue Jays || 4 – 3 (10) || Takatsu (1–0) || Speier (1–3) || || 2:45 || N/A || 14–8 || box
|- style="text-align:center;background-color:#ffbbbb"
| 23 || May 1 || Blue Jays || 6–10 || Lilly (2–2) || Wright (0–4) || || 3:23 || 22,072 || 14–9 || box
|- style="text-align:center;background-color:#bbffbb"
| 24 || May 2 || Blue Jays || 3–2 || Garland (2–1) || Batista (0–3) || Koch (3) || 2:17 || 15,550 || 15–9 || box
|- style="text-align:center;background-color:#bbffbb"
| 25 || May 3 || @ Orioles || 5–4 || Schoeneweis (3–1) || DeJean (0–3) || Koch (4) || 3:10 || 18,849 || 16–9 || box
|- style="text-align:center;background-color:#ffbbbb"
| 26 || May 4 || @ Orioles || 3–10 || López (2–1) || Loaiza (4–1) || || 2:52 || 21,488 || 16–10 || box
|- style="text-align:center;background-color:#bbffbb"
| 27 || May 5 || @ Orioles || 6–5 || Takatsu (2–0) || Ryan (1–1) || Koch (5) || 3:01 || 20,978 || 17–10 || box
|- style="text-align:center;background-color:#ffbbbb"
| 28 || May 7 || @ Blue Jays || 4–5 || Adams (3–1) || Politte (0–1) || || 2:44 || 15,661 || 17–11 || box
|- style="text-align:center;background-color:#ffbbbb"
| 29 || May 8 || @ Blue Jays || 2–4 || Frasor (1–1) || Cotts (0–1) || Adams (1) || 2:20 || 18,368 || 17–12 || box
|- style="text-align:center;background-color:#ffbbbb"
| 30 || May 9 || @ Blue Jays || 2–5 || Miller (1–0) || Loaiza (4–2) || Ligtenberg (1) || 2:11 || 17,546 || 17–13 || box
|- style="text-align:center;background-color:#bbffbb"
| 31 || May 11 || Orioles || 15–0 || Buehrle (2–1) || Ponson (2–3) || || 2:20 || 20,400 || 18–13 || box
|- style="text-align:center;background-color:#bbbbbb"
| – || May 12 || Orioles || colspan=8 | Postponed (rain) Rescheduled for May 13
|- style="text-align:center;background-color:#ffbbbb"
| 32 || May 13 || Orioles || 0–1 || Cabrera (1–0) || Garland (2–2) || Julio (6) || 2:27 || N/A || 18–14 || box
|- style="text-align:center;background-color:#bbffbb"
| 33 || May 13 || Orioles || 6–5 || Jackson (2–0) || Bédard (0–1) || Koch (6) || 2:30 || 18,324 || 19–14 || box
|- style="text-align:center;background-color:#ffbbbb"
| 34 || May 14 || Twins || 2–3 || Rincón (5–2) || Marte (1–2) || Nathan (11) || 3:06 || 15,962 || 19–15 || box
|- style="text-align:center;background-color:#ffbbbb"
| 35 || May 15 || Twins || 1–4 || Greisinger (1–2) || Loaiza (4–3) || Nathan (12) || 2:12 || 32,360 || 19–16 || box
|- style="text-align:center;background-color:#bbffbb"
| 36 || May 16 || Twins || 11–0 || Buehrle (3–1) || Silva (5–1) || || 2:34 || 26,348 || 20–16 || box
|- style="text-align:center;background-color:#ffbbbb"
| 37 || May 17 || @ Indians || 2–7 || Lee (5–0) || Diaz (0–1) || || 2:46 || 15,617 || 20–17 || box
|- style="text-align:center;background-color:#bbffbb"
| 38 || May 18 || @ Indians || 4–2 || Garland (3–2) || Durbin (3–4) || Koch (7) || 2:18 || 15,298 || 21–17 || box
|- style="text-align:center;background-color:#bbffbb"
| 39 || May 19 || @ Indians || 15–3 || Schoeneweis (4–1) || Davis (1–3) || || 3:04 || 17,205 || 22–17 || box
|- style="text-align:center;background-color:#bbffbb"
| 40 || May 20 || @ Twins || 10–3 || Loaiza (5–3) || Greisinger (1–3) || || 2:32 || 17,640 || 23–17 || box
|- style="text-align:center;background-color:#bbffbb"
| 41 || May 21 || @ Twins || 8–2 || Buehrle (4–1) || Silva (5–2) || || 2:20 || 30,116 || 24–17 || box
|- style="text-align:center;background-color:#ffbbbb"
| 42 || May 22 || @ Twins || 1–9 || Radke (4–2) || Cotts (0–2) || || 2:39 || 27,413 || 24–18 || box
|- style="text-align:center;background-color:#bbffbb"
| 43 || May 23 || @ Twins || 17–7 || Garland (4–2) || Santana (2–2) || || 3:06 || 22,859 || 25–18 || box
|- style="text-align:center;background-color:#ffbbbb"
| 44 || May 25 || Rangers || 4–7 || Rogers (7–2) || Schoeneweis (4–2) || Cordero (15) || 3:14 || 22,359 || 25–19 || box
|- style="text-align:center;background-color:#bbffbb"
| 45 || May 26 || Rangers || 4–0 || Loaiza (6–3) || Benoit (2–2) || || 2:28 || 18,185 || 26–19 || box
|- style="text-align:center;background-color:#bbffbb"
| 46 || May 27 || Rangers || 9–0 || Buehrle (5–1) || Drese (2–2) || || 2:14 || 14,428 || 27–19 || box
|- style="text-align:center;background-color:#bbffbb"
| 47 || May 28 || Angels || 4–3 || Takatsu (3–0) || Ortiz (1–4) || || 3:11 || 21,163 || 28–19 || box
|- style="text-align:center;background-color:#ffbbbb"
| 48 || May 29 || Angels || 1–5 || Sele (4–0) || Rauch (0–1) || || 2:51 || 25,050 || 28–20 || box
|- style="text-align:center;background-color:#bbffbb"
| 49 || May 30 || Angels || 11–2 || Schoeneweis (5–2) || Lackey (3–6) || || 2:30 || 14,344 || 29–20 || box

|- style="text-align:center;background-color:#ffbbbb"
| 50 || June 1 || @ Athletics || 4 – 6 (12) || Duchscherer (3–1) || Cotts (0–3) || || 3:06 || 14,344 || 29–21 || box
|- style="text-align:center;background-color:#ffbbbb"
| 51 || June 2 || @ Athletics || 2 – 3 (10) || Rhodes (2–3) || Adkins (2–2) || || 2:50 || 33,111 || 29–22 || box
|- style="text-align:center;background-color:#bbffbb"
| 52 || June 4 || @ Mariners || 4–2 || Garland (5–2) || García (3–4) || Koch (8) || 2:36 || 36,340 || 30–22 || box
|- style="text-align:center;background-color:#ffbbbb"
| 53 || June 5 || @ Mariners || 2–4 || Franklin (3–4) || Schoeneweis (5–3) || Guardado (10) || 2:58 || 40,050 || 30–23 || box
|- style="text-align:center;background-color:#ffbbbb"
| 54 || June 6 || @ Mariners || 4–5 || Hasegawa (2–3) || Koch (1–1) || || 3:13 || 36,462 || 30–24 || box
|- style="text-align:center;background-color:#bbffbb"
| 55 || June 8 || Phillies || 14–11 || Buehrle (6–1) || Telemaco (0–2) || Politte (1) || 2:57 || 33,114 || 31–24 || box
|- style="text-align:center;background-color:#ffbbbb"
| 56 || June 9 || Phillies || 10–13 || Milton (8–1) || Garland (5–3) || || 3:24 || 17,570 || 31–25 || box
|- style="text-align:center;background-color:#bbbbbb"
| – || June 10 || Phillies ||colspan=8| Postponed (rain), rescheduled for August 30
|- style="text-align:center;background-color:#ffbbbb"
| 57 || June 11 || Braves || 4–6 || Wright (5–5) || Schoeneweis (5–4) || || 2:33 || 23,217 || 31–26 || box
|- style="text-align:center;background-color:#bbffbb"
| 58 || June 12 || Braves || 10–8 || Loaiza (7–3) || Thomson (5–4) || Takatsu (1) || 2:52 || 34,719 || 32–26 || box
|- style="text-align:center;background-color:#bbffbb"
| 59 || June 13 || Braves || 10–3 || Buehrle (7–1) || Smith (0–3) || || 2:18 || 32,589 || 33–26 || box
|- style="text-align:center;background-color:#bbffbb"
| 60 || June 15 || @ Marlins || 7 – 5 (10) || Marte (2–2) || Borland (1–1) || Takatsu (2) || 3:10 || 15,345 || 34–26 || box
|- style="text-align:center;background-color:#ffbbbb"
| 61 || June 16 || @ Marlins || 0–4 || Pavano (7–2) || Schoeneweis (5–5) || || 2:10 || 14,310 || 34–27 || box
|- style="text-align:center;background-color:#ffbbbb"
| 62 || June 17 || @ Marlins || 1 – 2 (11) || Benítez (2–0) || Politte (0–2) || || 3:11 || 17,857 || 34–28 || box
|- style="text-align:center;background-color:#bbffbb"
| 63 || June 18 || @ Expos || 11–7 || Cotts (1–3) || Ayala (0–6) || Marte (3) || 3:02 || 4,576 || 35–28 || box
|- style="text-align:center;background-color:#ffbbbb"
| 64 || June 19 || @ Expos || 14–17 || Fikac (1–2) || Muñoz (0–1) || Cordero (2) || 3:28 || 18,414 || 35–29 || box
|- style="text-align:center;background-color:#ffbbbb"
| 65 || June 20 || @ Expos || 2–4 || Cordero (2–1) || Garland (5–4) || || 1:54 || 6,546 || 35–30 || box
|- style="text-align:center;background-color:#ffbbbb"
| 66 || June 21 || Indians || 1–5 || Sabathia (5–3) || Schoeneweis (5–6) || || 2:38 || 29,722 || 35–31 || box
|- style="text-align:center;background-color:#bbffbb"
| 67 || June 22 || Indians || 11 – 9 (10) || Takatsu (4–0) || Jimenez (1–5) || || 3:38 || 27,922 || 36–31 || box
|- style="text-align:center;background-color:#ffbbbb"
| 68 || June 23 || Indians || 5–9 || Lee (7–1) || Buehrle (7–2) || || 2:31 || 21,654 || 36–32 || box
|- style="text-align:center;background-color:#bbffbb"
| 69 || June 24 || Indians || 7–1 || Rauch (1–1) || Westbrook (6–4) || || 2:36 || 20,744 || 37–32 || box
|- style="text-align:center;background-color:#ffbbbb"
| 70 || June 25 || Cubs || 4–7 || Prior (2–1) || Garland (5–5) || Hawkins (10) || 2:58 || 39,596 || 37–33 || box
|- style="text-align:center;background-color:#bbffbb"
| 71 || June 26 || Cubs || 6–3 || Diaz (1–1) || Zambrano (8–3) || Takatsu (3) || 2:37 || 39,553 || 38–33 || box
|- style="text-align:center;background-color:#bbffbb"
| 72 || June 27 || Cubs || 9–4 || Loaiza (8–3) || Maddux (6–6) || || 2:48 || 38,526 || 39–33 || box
|- style="text-align:center;background-color:#bbffbb"
| 73 || June 29 || @ Twins || 6–2 || Buehrle (8–2) || Silva (8–5) || || 2:04 || 24,704 || 40–33 || box
|- style="text-align:center;background-color:#bbffbb"
| 74 || June 30 || @ Twins || 9–6 || García (5–7) || Radke (4–4) || || 2:08 || 25,433 || 41–33 || box

|- style="text-align:center;background-color:#bbffbb"
| 75 || July 1 || @ Twins || 2–1 || Garland (6–5) || Santana (6–5) || Marte (4) || 2:20 || 21,127 || 42–33 || box
|- style="text-align:center;background-color:#ffbbbb"
| 76 || July 2 || @ Cubs || 2–6 || Zambrano (9–3) || Loaiza (8–4) || || 2:44 || 39,625 || 42–34 || box
|- style="text-align:center;background-color:#ffbbbb"
| 77 || July 3 || @ Cubs || 2 – 4 (6) || Maddux (7–6) || Diaz (1–2) || Wuertz (1) || 1:40 || 39,528 || 42–35 || box
|- style="text-align:center;background-color:#ffbbbb"
| 78 || July 4 || @ Cubs || 1–2 || Hawkins (2–1) || Takatsu (4–1) || || 2:18 || 38,596 || 42–36 || box
|- style="text-align:center;background-color:#ffbbbb"
| 79 || July 6 || Angels || 2–6 || Lackey (6–8) || García (5–8) || || 2:36 || 26,209 || 42–37 || box
|- style="text-align:center;background-color:#ffbbbb"
| 80 || July 7 || Angels || 0–12 || Washburn (9–4) || Schoeneweis (5–7) || || 2:27 || 21,378 || 42–38 || box
|- style="text-align:center;background-color:#bbffbb"
| 81 || July 8 || Angels || 9–8 || Marte (3–2) || Donnelly (1–2) || || 3:12 || 27,845 || 43–38 || box
|- style="text-align:center;background-color:#bbffbb"
| 82 || July 9 || Mariners || 6–2 || Garland (7–5) || Piñeiro (4–10) || || 2:17 || 21,713 || 44–38 || box
|- style="text-align:center;background-color:#bbffbb"
| 83 || July 10 || Mariners || 3–2 || Buehrle (9–2) || Thornton (0–2) || Takatsu (4) || 2:13 || 37,405 || 45–38 || box
|- style="text-align:center;background-color:#bbffbb"
| 84 || July 11 || Mariners || 4–3 || García (6–8) || Moyer (6–6) || Takatsu (5) || 2:19 || 31,305 || 46–38 || box
|- style="text-align:center;"
|colspan="11" style="background-color:#bbcaff" | All-Star Break: AL defeats NL 9–4 at Minute Maid Park
|- style="text-align:center;background-color:#ffbbbb"
| 85 || July 15 || @ Athletics || 2–4 || Harden (4–5) || Garland (7–6) || Dotel (17) || 2:02 || 15,414 || 46–39 || box
|- style="text-align:center;background-color:#ffbbbb"
| 86 || July 16 || @ Athletics || 1–5 || Zito (5–7) || Buehrle (9–3) || Dotel (18) || 2:28 || 40,891 || 46–40 || box
|- style="text-align:center;background-color:#bbffbb"
| 87 || July 17 || @ Athletics || 5–2 || García (7–8) || Redman (6–7) || Takatsu (6) || 2:36 || 26,285 || 47–40 || box
|- style="text-align:center;background-color:#ffbbbb"
| 88 || July 18 || @ Athletics || 3–5 || Mulder (14–2) || Loaiza (8–5) || Dotel (19) || 2:19 || 33,274 || 47–41 || box
|- style="text-align:center;background-color:#bbffbb"
| 89 || July 19 || @ Rangers || 12–6 || Schoeneweis (6–7) || Benoit (3–5) || || 3:06 || 28,805 || 48–41 || box
|- style="text-align:center;background-color:#ffbbbb"
| 90 || July 20 || @ Rangers || 4–6 || Almanzar (7–1) || Marte (3–3) || Cordero (29) || 2:56 || 27,308 || 48–42 || box
|- style="text-align:center;background-color:#bbffbb"
| 91 || July 21 || @ Indians || 14–0 || Buehrle (10–3) || Lee (10–2) || || 2:31 || 21,922 || 49–42 || box
|- style="text-align:center;background-color:#bbffbb"
| 92 || July 22 || @ Indians || 3–0 || García (8–8) || Sabathia (6–5) || Takatsu (7) || 2:31 || 23,168 || 50–42 || box
|- style="text-align:center;background-color:#bbffbb"
| 93 || July 23 || Tigers || 6–4 || Loaiza (9–5) || Robertson (9–5) || Takatsu (8) || 2:16 || 32,930 || 51–42 || box
|- style="text-align:center;background-color:#bbffbb"
| 94 || July 24 || Tigers || 7–6 || Marte (4–3) || Urbina (3–5) || || 2:47 || 38,055 || 52–42 || box
|- style="text-align:center;background-color:#ffbbbb"
| 95 || July 25 || Tigers || 2–9 || Ledezma (1–0) || Garland (7–7) || || 3:08 || 26,716 || 52–43 || box
|- style="text-align:center;background-color:#ffbbbb"
| 96 || July 26 || Twins || 2–6 || Radke (7–6) || Buehrle (10–4) || || 2:53 || 38,362 || 52–44 || box
|- style="text-align:center;background-color:#ffbbbb"
| 97 || July 27 || Twins || 3–7 || Santana (9–6) || García (8–9) || || 2:58 || 37,528 || 52–45 || box
|- style="text-align:center;background-color:#ffbbbb"
| 98 || July 28 || Twins || 4 – 5 (10) || Mulholland (3–3) || Takatsu (4–2) || Nathan (28) || 3:07 || 32,605 || 52–46 || box
|- style="text-align:center;background-color:#ffbbbb"
| 99 || July 29 || @ Tigers || 2–3 || Johnson (8–8) || Schoeneweis (6–8) || Urbina (16) || 2:40 || 26,110 || 52–47 || box
|- style="text-align:center;background-color:#ffbbbb"
| 100 || July 30 || @ Tigers || 4–5 || Yan (1–2) || Marte (4–4) || Urbina (17) || 2:26 || 34,732 || 52–48 || box
|- style="text-align:center;background-color:#ffbbbb"
| 101 || July 31 || @ Tigers || 2 – 3 (10) || Urbina (4–5) || Politte (0–3) || || 2:28 || 40,471 || 52–49 || box

|- style="text-align:center;background-color:#bbffbb"
| 102 || August 1 || @ Tigers || 6–4 || García (9–9) || Bonderman (6–8) || Takatsu (9) || 2:33 || 34,279 || 53–49 || box
|- style="text-align:center;background-color:#bbffbb"
| 103 || August 3 || @ Royals || 12–4 || Contreras (1–0) || Wood (1–4) || || 2:48 || 13,981 || 54–49 || box
|- style="text-align:center;background-color:#ffbbbb"
| 104 || August 4 || @ Royals || 0–11 || Anderson (2–9) || Schoeneweis (6–9) || || 2:18 || 16,194 || 54–50 || box
|- style="text-align:center;background-color:#ffbbbb"
| 105 || August 5 || @ Royals || 4–6 || Greinke (4–8) || Garland (7–8) || Field (3) || 2:19 || 15,863 || 54–51 || box
|- style="text-align:center;background-color:#ffbbbb"
| 106 || August 6 || Indians || 2–3 || Sabathia (8–6) || Buehrle (10–5) || Wickman (3) || 2:43 || 23,811 || 54–52 || box
|- style="text-align:center;background-color:#ffbbbb"
| 107 || August 7 || Indians || 5–6 || Miller (5–3) || Takatsu (4–3) || Wickman (4) || 2:26 || 32,790 || 54–53 || box
|- style="text-align:center;background-color:#bbffbb"
| 108 || August 8 || Indians || 3–2 || Takatsu (5–3) || Betancourt (5–6) || || 2:48 || 25,897 || 55–53 || box
|- style="text-align:center;background-color:#ffbbbb"
| 109 || August 9 || Indians || 11 – 13 (10) || Westbrook (10–5) || Diaz (1–3) || || 3:07 || 31,116 || 55–54 || box
|- style="text-align:center;background-color:#bbffbb"
| 110 || August 10 || Royals || 9–3 || Garland (8–8) || Greinke (4–9) || || 2:36 || 20,506 || 56–54 || box
|- style="text-align:center;background-color:#ffbbbb"
| 111 || August 11 || Royals || 2–4 || May (9–12) || Buehrle (10–6) || Cerda (2) || 2:38 || 18,396 || 56–55 || box
|- style="text-align:center;background-color:#bbffbb"
| 112 || August 12 || Royals || 3–2 || García (10–9) || Serrano (0–1) || Takatsu (10) || 2:13 || 22,399 || 57–55 || box
|- style="text-align:center;background-color:#bbffbb"
| 113 || August 13 || @ Red Sox || 8–7 || Contreras (10–5) || Wakefield (8–7) || Takatsu (11) || 3:23 || 35,028 || 58–55 || box
|- style="text-align:center;background-color:#ffbbbb"
| 114 || August 14 || @ Red Sox || 3–4 || Schilling (14–6) || Adkins (2–3) || Foulke (19) || 2:34 || 35,012 || 58–56 || box
|- style="text-align:center;background-color:#bbffbb"
| 115 || August 15 || @ Red Sox || 5–4 || Buehrle (11–6) || Arroyo (5–9) || Takatsu (12) || 2:53 || 34,405 || 59–56 || box
|- style="text-align:center;background-color:#ffbbbb"
| 116 || August 17 || Tigers || 8–11 || Maroth (10–7) || García (10–10) || Urbina (21) || 3:00 || 19,856 || 59–57 || box
|- style="text-align:center;background-color:#bbffbb"
| 117 || August 18 || Tigers || 9–2 || Contreras (11–5) || Bonderman (6–10) || || 2:39 || 21,381 || 60–57 || box
|- style="text-align:center;background-color:#ffbbbb"
| 118 || August 19 || Tigers || 4–8 || Ledezma (11–5) || Garland (8–9) || Knotts (1) || 2:34 || 24,554 || 60–58 || box
|- style="text-align:center;background-color:#ffbbbb"
| 119 || August 20 || Red Sox || 1 – 10 (10) || Schilling (15–6) || Buehrle (11–7) || || 2:17 || 38,720 || 60–59 || box
|- style="text-align:center;background-color:#ffbbbb"
| 120 || August 21 || Red Sox || 7–10 || Arroyo (6–9) || Stewart (0–1) || Foulke (21) || 3:10 || 37,303 || 60–60 || box
|- style="text-align:center;background-color:#ffbbbb"
| 121 || August 22 || Red Sox || 5–6 || Leskanic (2–5) || Marte (4–5) || Foulke (22) || 3:05 || 34,355 || 60–61 || box
|- style="text-align:center;background-color:#ffbbbb"
| 122 || August 23 || @ Tigers || 0–7 || Bonderman (7–10) || Contreras (11–6) || || 2:26 || 25,220 || 60–62 || box
|- style="text-align:center;background-color:#bbffbb"
| 123 || August 24 || @ Tigers || 9–5 || Garland (9–9) || Ledezma (3–1) || || 2:36 || 24,584 || 61–62 || box
|- style="text-align:center;background-color:#ffbbbb"
| 124 || August 25 || @ Tigers || 4–5 || Robertson (11–7) || Buehrle (11–8) || || 2:29 || 23,254 || 61–63 || box
|- style="text-align:center;background-color:#bbffbb"
| 125 || August 26 || @ Indians || 14–9 || Cotts (2–3) || Durbin (5–6) || || 3:20 || 30,049 || 62–63 || box
|- style="text-align:center;background-color:#ffbbbb"
| 126 || August 27 || @ Indians || 3–6 || Sabathia (10–8) || Grilli (0–1) || Wickman (7) || 2:34 || 30,527 || 62–64 || box
|- style="text-align:center;background-color:#bbffbb"
| 127 || August 28 || @ Indians || 5–3 || Contreras (12–6) || Lee (10–6) || Takatsu (13) || 2:40 || 37,374 || 63–64 || box
|- style="text-align:center;background-color:#ffbbbb"
| 128 || August 29 || @ Indians || 0–9 || Elarton (3–9) || Garland (9–10) || || 1:56 || 32,834 || 63–65 || box
|- style="text-align:center;background-color:#bbffbb"
| 129 || August 30 || Phillies || 9–8 || Buehrle (12–8) || Hernández (2–5) || Takatsu (14) || 2:47 || 5,747 || 64–65 || box
|- style="text-align:center;background-color:#ffbbbb"
| 130 || August 31 || Athletics || 2–7 || Harden (9–5) || Diaz (1–4) || || 2:31 || 18,841 || 64–66 || box

|- style="text-align:center;background-color:#bbffbb"
| 131 || September 1 || Athletics || 5–4 || Takatsu (6–3) || Duchscherer (5–5) || || 2:36 || 21,564 || 65–66 || box
|- style="text-align:center;background-color:#ffbbbb"
| 132 || September 2 || Athletics || 2–4 || Redman (10–10) || Contreras (12–7) || Dotel (31) || 2:55 || 17,579 || 65–67 || box
|- style="text-align:center;background-color:#bbffbb"
| 133 || September 3 || Mariners || 7–5 || Garland (10–10) || Madritsch (3–2) || Takatsu (15) || 2:50 || 21,716 || 66–67 || box
|- style="text-align:center;background-color:#bbffbb"
| 134 || September 4 || Mariners || 8–7 || Buehrle (13–8) || Franklin (3–14) || Takatsu (16) || 2:44 || 24,191 || 67–67 || box
|- style="text-align:center;background-color:#bbffbb"
| 135 || September 5 || Mariners || 6–2 || Diaz (2–4) || Moyer (6–10) || Marte (5) || 2:30 || 30,409 || 68–67 || box
|- style="text-align:center;background-color:#bbffbb"
| 136 || September 6 || @ Rangers || 7 – 4 (10) || Grilli (1–1) || Park (3–5) || || 2:50 || 31,251 || 69–67 || box
|- style="text-align:center;background-color:#ffbbbb"
| 137 || September 7 || @ Rangers || 3–10 || Rogers (16–7) || Contreras (12–8) || || 2:37 || 20,004 || 69–68 || box
|- style="text-align:center;background-color:#bbffbb"
| 138 || September 8 || @ Rangers || 5–2 || García (11–10) || Wasdin (2–4) || Takatsu (17) || 2:48 || 21,836 || 70–68 || box
|- style="text-align:center;background-color:#bbffbb"
| 139 || September 9 || @ Rangers || 7–3 || Buehrle (14–8) || Young (1–2) || || 2:24 || 19,384 || 71–68 || box
|- style="text-align:center;background-color:#ffbbbb"
| 140 || September 10 || @ Angels || 5–7 || Rodríguez (3–1) || Bajenaru (0–1) || Percival (28) || 3:03 || 42,431 || 71–69 || box
|- style="text-align:center;background-color:#bbffbb"
| 141 || September 11 || @ Angels || 13–6 || Grilli (2–1) || Sele (8–3) || || 2:57 || 42,568 || 72–69 || box
|- style="text-align:center;background-color:#ffbbbb"
| 142 || September 12 || @ Angels || 0–11 || Colón (15–11) || Contreras (12–9) || || 2:39 || 41,932 || 72–70 || box
|- style="text-align:center;background-color:#ffbbbb"
| 143 || September 14 || @ Twins || 2–10 || Santana (18–6) || García (11–11) || || 2:32 || 22,145 || 72–71 || box
|- style="text-align:center;background-color:#ffbbbb"
| 144 || September 15 || @ Twins || 1–6 || Silva (12–8) || Buehrle (14–9) || || 2:12 || 20,612 || 72–72 || box
|- style="text-align:center;background-color:#ffbbbb"
| 145 || September 16 || @ Twins || 1–10 || Lohse (8–11) || Garland (10–11) || || 2:21 || 20,052 || 72–73 || box
|- style="text-align:center;background-color:#ffbbbb"
| 146 || September 17 || @ Tigers || 10 – 11 (10) || Yan (3–4) || Takatsu (6–4) || Ennis (1) || 3:21 || 23,132 || 72–74 || box
|- style="text-align:center;background-color:#bbffbb"
| 147 || September 18 || @ Tigers || 9 – 8 (12) || Marte (5–5) || Levine (3–4) || || 4:05 || 23,533 || 73–74 || box
|- style="text-align:center;background-color:#bbffbb"
| 148 || September 19 || @ Tigers || 6–1 || García (12–11) || Bonderman (10–12) || || 2:44 || 19,269 || 74–74 || box
|- style="text-align:center;background-color:#ffbbbb"
| 149 || September 20 || Twins || 2–8 || Silva (13–8) || Buehrle (14–10) || || 2:09 || 21,991 || 74–75 || box
|- style="text-align:center;background-color:#bbffbb"
| 150 || September 21 || Twins || 8–6 || Cotts (3–3) || Romero (7–2) || Takatsu (18) || 2:39 || 14,771 || 75–75 || box
|- style="text-align:center;background-color:#bbffbb"
| 151 || September 22 || Twins || 7–6 || Cotts (4–3) || Roa (2–3) || || 2:51 || 22,396 || 76–75 || box
|- style="text-align:center;background-color:#bbffbb"
| 152 || September 23 || Royals || 7–6 || Marte (6–5) || Affeldt (3–4) || || 2:41 || 16,015 || 77–75 || box
|- style="text-align:center;background-color:#ffbbbb"
| 153 || September 24 || Royals || 6–8 || Gobble (9–8) || Diaz (2–5) || || 3:09 || 14,270 || 77–76 || box
|- style="text-align:center;background-color:#bbffbb"
| 154 || September 25 || Royals || 5–1 || Buehrle (15–10) || Bautista (0–4) || || 2:13 || 20,625 || 78–76 || box
|- style="text-align:center;background-color:#bbffbb"
| 155 || September 26 || Royals || 5–1 || Garland (11–11) || Anderson (5–12) || Marte (6) || 2:00 || 18,949 || 79–76 || box
|- style="text-align:center;background-color:#ffbbbb"
| 156 || September 27 || @ Tigers || 2–4 || Knotts (6–6) || Grilli (2–2) || Yan (6) || 2:04 || 12,495 || 79–77 || box
|- style="text-align:center;background-color:#ffbbbb"
| 157 || September 28 || @ Tigers || 4–6 || Germán (1–0) || Cotts (4–4) || Yan (7) || 2:44 || 13,860 || 79–78 || box
|- style="text-align:center;background-color:#bbffbb"
| 158 || September 29 || @ Tigers || 11–2 || García (13–11) || Johnson (8–15) || || 2:21 || 8,944 || 80–78 || box
|- style="text-align:center;background-color:#bbffbb"
| 159 || September 30 || @ Royals || 9–2 || Buehrle (16–10) || Camp (2–2) || || 2:21 || 11,507 || 81–78 || box
|- style="text-align:center;background-color:#bbffbb"
| 160 || October 1 || @ Royals || 4–2 || Garland (12–11) || Cerda (1–4) || Takatsu (19) || 2:40 || 14,766 || 82–78 || box
|- style="text-align:center;background-color:#ffbbbb"
| 161 || October 2 || @ Royals || 2–10 || Anderson (6–12) || Grilli (2–3) || || 2:26 || 16,028 || 82–79 || box
|- style="text-align:center;background-color:#bbffbb"
| 162 || October 3 || @ Royals || 5–0 || Contreras (13–9) || Greinke (8–11) || || 2:20 || 14,586 || 83–79 || box

Player stats

Batting 
Note: G = Games played; AB = At bats; R = Runs scored; H = Hits; 2B = Doubles; 3B = Triples; HR = Home runs; RBI = Runs batted in; BB = Base on balls; SO = Strikeouts; AVG = Batting average; SB = Stolen bases

Pitching 
Note: W = Wins; L = Losses; ERA = Earned run average; G = Games pitched; GS = Games started; SV = Saves; IP = Innings pitched; H = Hits allowed; R = Runs allowed; ER = Earned runs allowed; HR = Home runs allowed; BB = Walks allowed; K = Strikeouts

Farm system

References

External links 
 2004 Chicago White Sox at Baseball Reference

Chicago White Sox seasons
Chicago White Sox season
White